Cornelia Connelly, SCHJ (née Peacock; January 15, 1809 – April 18, 1879) was an American-born educator who was the foundress of the Society of the Holy Child Jesus, a Catholic religious institute. In 1846, she founded the first of many Holy Child schools, in England.

Connelly has been proposed for sainthood in the Catholic Church. 1992, she was proclaimed as Venerable by Pope John Paul II.

Early life
Cornelia Peacock was born in Philadelphia and raised a Presbyterian by her father, Ralph William Peacock Sr. and mother, Mary Swope. With her father dying in 1818 and her mother dying in 1823, Peacock was left orphaned at the age of 14. She went to live with her half-sister Isabella and her husband, Austin Montgomery. In 1831 she was baptized into the Protestant Episcopal Church and, despite her family's protests, married the Reverend Pierce Connelly, an Episcopal priest. Cornelia had been well educated by tutors at home. Pierce was five years her senior, a graduate of the University of Pennsylvania. The two moved to Natchez, Mississippi, where Pierce had accepted the Holy Trinity Episcopal church's rectorship. By all accounts, they were an immensely happy couple and welcomed by their parishioners. Pierce profited from land investments, and in 1835 was appointed chairman of the Episcopal Convention of the Southwest, which augured well for a future bishopric. The couple had a son, Mercer, and a daughter, Adeline. Later research has also revealed that the Connellys owned and sold slaves, the first having been gifted to them by a friend after the birth of their first child.

Family life
Before marrying Cornelia's father, Cornelia's mother married John Bowen Sr., a Jamaican plantation owner. Together they had four children. However, only two, a daughter named Isabella and a son named John Jr., made it to adulthood. When John Sr. died in 1794, the children assumed control of the plantation, and Swope received an annual annuity of $1,655. 

In 1835 a wave of anti-Catholic resentment struck the US due to massive Catholic immigration from Europe. Consequently, the Connellys delved into a study of Catholic beliefs and practices. Soon Pierce had become so uncertain in his own beliefs that he resigned from his parish and went to St. Louis to consult with Bishop Joseph Rosati about conversion. In doing so, Pierce sacrificed a promising career as well as the financial security of his family. His wife however supported him fully: "I am ready to submit to whatever he believes to be the path of duty." Pierce now took his family to Rome before committing himself. Cornelia, however, was already received into the Catholic Church while waiting in New Orleans for passage to Italy. In Rome, Pierce petitioned for admittance to the church so compellingly that, after meeting Pierce in a personal audience, Pope Gregory XVI was moved to tears. Two months later, he was received into the church. Ordination was a different matter. Celibacy being required of priests in the church's Latin rite, Vatican officials suggested that he consider the Eastern rite instead, which ordains married men – particularly as Cornelia was pregnant again. Being an ambitious man, Pierce ignored the advice. There were no Eastern-rite parishes in the US for him to serve, and only celibates can become Eastern-rite bishops. The family were otherwise happy in Rome, where they stayed in the palazzo of the English Catholic John Talbot, 16th Earl of Shrewsbury. The Connellys moved on to Vienna, where their third child John Henry was born. But in July, a bank crisis in the US forced Pierce to return to Natchez to find employment. Offered a position at a Jesuit college in Grand Coteau, Louisiana, he taught English, while 29-year-old Cornelia taught music at an academy for girls. For the first time the couple were poor, but by all accounts quite content.

But soon tragedy came to the Connellys. In the summer of 1839, their fourth child, Mary Magdalen, died six weeks after birth. In early 1840, still grieving the baby's death, Cornelia made her first retreat of three days. In February, her two-year-old son John Henry was playing with his Newfoundland dog, when the dog accidentally pushed him into a vat of boiling sugar. There was no doctor available, so he died of severe burns in Cornelia's arms after 43 hours. Eight months later, while making a retreat himself, Pierce informed her that he was now certain of his vocation as a priest in the Catholic Church. Cornelia was aware that this would mean their separation for life and a breakup of the family. She urged him to consider his wish deeply and twice over. The couple agreed to a period of celibacy. Cornelia was in any case already pregnant with their fifth child, Frank, born in the spring of 1841. In 1842, Pierce broke up the family. Against the advice of the family's friend, Bishop Antoine Blanc of New Orleans, he sold their home and went to England, where he placed 9-year-old Mercer in a boarding school and applied unsuccessfully to enter the Jesuits. Cornelia stayed with the two younger children in a small cottage on the convent grounds at Grand Coteau, leading a nun-like life of work and prayer. In 1843, Pierce arrived in Rome, where Pope Gregory instructed him to bring his family so that officials could discuss the matter with Cornelia. Pierce returned to the US, taking his family with him back to Rome, where they settled into a large apartment near the Palazzo Borghese. After receiving Cornelia's personal consent to her husband's ordination, the pope arranged a swift permission, and within three months the couple were formally separated. Cornelia moved with the baby and his nurse into a retreat house at the convent at the top of the Spanish Steps, living as a laywoman for as long as her youngest child needed her. Adeline went to the convent school, where her mother taught English and music. Pierce received the tonsure and took up theological studies, hoping to become a Jesuit. However, the Vatican had arranged that he could visit his wife and children once a week, and the Jesuits disapproved of such frequent contact. In May 1844, Pope Gregory showed his appreciation of this "big catch" for the church by sending a huge fish, freshly pulled from the Tiber.

Society of the Holy Child Jesus
Cornelia had one final talk with Pierce before he took major orders, pleading him to consider the breakup of the family and to return to normal family life. But he insisted on taking Holy Orders. In keeping with the requirements of canon law, Cornelia pronounced a vow of perpetual chastity, releasing her husband for ordination. In June, Pierce was ordained and said his first Mass, giving his daughter her first holy communion, while Cornelia sang in the choir. She was 36 and now had to work out her own future. The Cardinal Vicar of Rome assured her that her first duty was to care for 10-year-old Adeline and 5-year-old Frank and that she was under no obligation to become a nun. She was, however, invited to England to educate Catholic girls and the poor. With the help of Pierce, who was headed for England himself as chaplain to Lord Shrewsbury, she drew up a set of rules for a new religious congregation, which she wanted to call Society of the Holy Child Jesus. To avoid scandalizing English Protestants, Bishop Nicholas Wiseman put an end to the visitation permission that the couple had had in Rome. Correspondence would be their only contact in the future. To Cornelia's anguish, Wiseman also insisted that she send Adeline and Frank away to boarding school.

Cornelia was sent to a large convent at St. Mary's Church in Derby. Soon she was running a day school for 200 pupils, an evening school for factory women, and a crowded Sunday school program, as well as training novices to her "Society of the Holy Child Jesus." The institute, whose constitution is based on that of the Jesuits, remains devoted to teaching young women and operates schools primarily in the United States.

After a year of total separation, Pierce arrived unannounced at the convent to see his wife. Cornelia was upset and told him not to repeat his visit. He wrote her a letter of reproach, and she replied with bitterness, acknowledging his continued physical attraction for her and her difficulties in overcoming it. In December 1847 she took her perpetual vows as a nun and was formally installed as superior general of the society. Pierce did not attend the ceremony, being jealous of Bishop Wiseman's jurisdiction over his wife. In January 1848 he removed the children from their schools without informing their mother. He put 6-year-old Frank in a secret home while taking Mercer and Adeline with him to Europe, hoping that Cornelia would follow. Instead, she vowed to remain faithful to her obligations as Superior of the new community. Pierce went to Rome, posing as the founder of the Society of the Holy Child Jesus, presenting to the Congregation for the Propagation of the Faith his version of the society, in the hope that this would help him gain control over his wife. His efforts were thwarted when Cornelia heard of them, but he remained registered as the society's co-founder, which was to cause considerable confusion in the future. Upon his return, Pierce called on Cornelia, bringing her a gift from Pope Pius IX; but she refused to see him unless he agreed to return Adeline to her care. He was livid when Bishop Wiseman, unable to meet expenses connected with the schools, had Cornelia move her nuns to his district at St. Leonard's-on-Sea in Sussex. Pierce was convinced that this was a ploy by the bishop to gain greater control over her.

He even pressed a lawsuit against her that gained notoriety in England. "Connelly v. Connelly" was a major scandal which, Pierce claimed, Cornelia could avoid only by returning to live with him. Lord Shrewsbury asked her to leave England to avoid embarrassing the entire Catholic Church in England. She refused, believing this would betray both her vows and her institute. Bishop Wiseman supported her decision and provided lawyers for her defense. The court was Protestant, though, and the statement signed by Pierce entirely omitted his conversion to the Catholic Church and the separation and ordination as a Catholic priest. It petitioned that Cornelia be "compelled by law to return and render him conjugal rights". Cornelia's lawyers gave the omitted facts, but after a year, the judge pronounced against accepting her allegation since Roman law is not binding in England. Cornelia had two options: Forcible return to Pierce or prison. Her lawyers immediately appealed the case to the Privy Council to spare her this. Popular opinion favored Pierce, and on Guy Fawkes Day, marchers carried effigies of Wiseman and Cornelia through Chelsea. She and the bishop were denounced from Protestant pulpits. Finally, the Privy Council suspended the judgment favoring Pierce, ordering him to pay both parties' costs to date as a precondition for a second hearing. Cornelia had to pay these costs, which she could not afford; she was in effect the winner and could not be forced to return to him. But she could not regain custody of her children since, under British law, a man's wife and children were his property. Mercer was shipped off to an uncle in the US, and Frank was placed in a school. Pierce himself earned a living from writing tracts against Jesuits, the pope, Catholic morals, and Cardinal Wiseman, which all served to keep Cornelia in the public eye to an extent where she had to take precautions against abduction by her husband. When the case finally was dismissed in 1857, Pierce took Adeline and Frank abroad. He kept Adeline with him, dressing her in little girl's outfits, while Frank settled in Rome, becoming an acclaimed painter. Devoted to his mother, he hated the Catholic Church for having destroyed his childhood home and his parents' lives. Cornelia never saw Mercer again; he died of yellow fever in New Orleans, aged 20.

The alienation of her children was the most significant suffering she endured. Cornelia Connelly herself stated that the Society of the Holy Child was "founded on a breaking heart".

Death and legacy
Cornelia Connelly died on 18 April 1879, at St Leonards-on-Sea, Sussex, where she had established Mayfield School; at her request, she was buried there. Today, the Sisters of the Holy Child Jesus are active in fourteen countries, striving to live the apostolic life as Cornelia did, seeking to meet the wants of the age through works of spiritual mercy. They are engaged in education and related spiritual and pastoral ministries.

Despite the strained economy of her Sussex school, Cornelia Connelly insisted on maintaining day schools for those who could afford tuition, as well as free schools for those who could not. She introduced Greek and Latin writers in translation for her brightest female pupils – courses that were otherwise reserved for male pupils. Amidst the Darwinian revolution, she had her pupils learn geology. She encouraged them to dabble in art, music, and drama, even to dance waltz and polka, as well as playing whist. Her attitude towards discipline was unusual in that a school to her was meant to be home, with the nuns as mothers who should love, trust and respect their pupils. Disliking the customary convent rules of constant surveillance, she encouraged mutual trust and respect for different talents.

In 1992, the Catholic Church proclaimed Cornelia as Venerable.

See also

References 

 Society of the Holy Child Jesus: Foundress
 "Scandal Revisited". Time April 8, 1957.
 Code, Joseph B. (1923) Great American Foundresses.

Further reading 
 Wadham, Juliana. The Case of Cornelia Connelly (London: Collins, 1956)
 McCarthy, Caritas. The spirituality of Cornelia Connelly: in God, for God, with God (Lewiston, New York: Edwin Mellen, 1986)
 McDougall, Roseanne. Cornelia Connelly's Innovations in Female Education, 1846–1864: Revolutionizing the School Curriculum for Girls (Lewiston, New York: Edwin Mellen, 2008) (Hors série).
 McElwee, Catie, A Generous Love: The Life of Cornelia Connelly, Rosemont, PA: SHCJ Communications Office, 2009. (Illustrations by Sister France White, SHCJ)

External links
 Cornelia Connelly Library

1809 births
1879 deaths
Society of the Holy Child Jesus
Converts to Roman Catholicism from Anglicanism
People from Natchez, Mississippi
Educators from Philadelphia
American women educators
Venerated Catholics by Pope John Paul II
Burials in Sussex
19th-century Roman Catholics
Catholics from Mississippi
American venerated Catholics
American slave owners